The Benemerenti medal is an honour awarded by the Pope to members of the clergy and laity for service to the Catholic Church.

This list is not complete. It only contains a selection of recipients.

Awarded by Pope Leo XIII
 William Turner, 1893: for a commentary on St. Thomas's "De Anima".

Awarded by Pope Benedict XV

 Hilda Beatrice Currie, 1939.

Awarded by Pope Pius XII

Ursula Muller, April 24, 1939
 Princess Ghislaine of Monaco, 1948.
 Maria Augusta von Trapp, 1949.
Bertha Quinn, 1949

Awarded by Pope Paul VI
 Salvador Pinto in 1964  From a Pinto family of Bondel, Mangalore, India. Unique figure in the Mangalorean community - in that he was a chauffeur to the Bishops of Mangalore from 1922 when a new car was presented to the Italian Jesuit Bishop Paul Perini till his retirement in 1966 at the age of 75. In this period of 44 years, he was chauffeur as follows: 1922 - 27 Bishop Paul Perini; 1927 - 30 Bishop Valerian D'Souza; 1930 - 55 Bishop Victor Fernandes; 1955 - 58 Bishop Basil Peres; 1958 - 64 Bishop Raymond D'Mello; 1964 - 66 Bishop Basil D'Souza.  He was awarded the BENE MERENTI for his many years of service to the Diocese of Mangalore (citation: Distinguished Mangalorean Catholics (1800-2000) A Historico_Biographical survey of the Mangalorean Catholic Community by (c) Michael Lobo 2000)
 Agnes Mary Littleboy from Holy Cross Parish, Parsons Green, Fulham. Awarded for her lifetime service to the Church in 1964 especially in her capacity of Lady Chairman of the parish 'Care Committee'. She acted as Godmother to almost 400 children during her time in this post and sent them cards on the anniversary of their christening until infirmity took its toll.
 Mary John Thottam, 1971 for religious poems
 Harry Carrigan, 1972. Of High Firs Road Southampton, presented on 18 December 1972. Awarded for lay service to the Church.   Carrigan was Master of Ceremonies at St Colman's Church, Thornhill. He was an altar boy and a silver medalist of the Guild of St Stephen.
Herbert Eugene Longenecker, 1977.
 Lester A. Wombacher, 1970. A founding member of Saint Dominic Parish, Eagle Rock, CA. Presented 27 April 1970 for lay service to the church, and the Dominican Order. Also, served the Congregation of the Passion of Jesus Christ at the Mater Dolorosa Monastery and Retreat House in Sierra Madre, CA.
Filipina Amosa Sio. Gold medal awarded for work for the church in Samoa

Joseph Lee b 1915 d 1986 in Gorton, Manchester. Joseph was an altar boy and altar server at St Francis monastery in Gorton, Manchester for 60 years. He was awarded the Benemerenti medal at a special mass at the monastery at noon on October 4, 1972

Awarded by Pope John XXIII

 Edward Flannery, 1977.
 Percival William Pine, 1962. Awarded for services to the church in connection with fundraising for the building project of St Joseph's Church, Gerrards Cross, Buckinghamshire, England.
Edward Roman, 1962. Awarded for service to the church at St. Paul's Mission at Marty, South Dakota, USA.
 Seraphina Fontes, 1962. Awarded for her tireless service to Tuberculosis patients at a sanatorium in Moodbidri, India.

Awarded by Pope John Paul II

 Paddy Crosbie, 1979. 
S. L. Larius, 1982
 Marietta Dias, 1985. She is the former chairwoman and co-founder of the Migrant Workers Protection Society.  She has been honoured by the US State Department for her volunteer work on the island nation of Bahrain in the Middle East, receiving the Hero Acting to End Modern-Day Slavery Award in 2008.
 Dame Maria Amieriye Osunde, 1993.
 James Werner, World Youth Day, August 1993
 Catherine Ann Cline, 1995.
 Irene Fleming, November, 2001. Awarded the Benemerenti medal by Pope John Paul II for service to the Church. An orphan, Irene Fleming migrated from her native Trinidad to Canada in her 40's where she worked as a nurse's aide, providing years of charitable service to local priests and others.
Mary Hawes, 27 July 2002.  Awarded for her service to the Church.
 Mario Kreutzberger, 2002. Pope John Paul II bestowed the Bene Merenti medal on Kreutzberger, the first non-Catholic to be so honored. Kreutzberger also served as a Special Goodwill Ambassador for UNICEF.
 Bob Schaffer, 2003. Awarded the Benemerenti medal by Pope John Paul II for service to the Church. Schaffer is also a Knight of the Equestrian Order of the Holy Sepulchre of Jerusalem by confirmation of the Holy See in the name of and by the authority of Pope John Paul II. and a member of the Knights of Columbus, Council 1214 of Fort Collins, Colorado.

Awarded by Pope Benedict XVI

Awarded by Pope Francis

References

 
Benemerenti medal